Moro is a city in Sherman County, Oregon, United States. The population was 324 at the 2010 census. It is the county seat of Sherman County It’s currently the least-populous county seat in Oregon. Moro was incorporated on February 17, 1899, by the Oregon Legislative Assembly. It was named for Moro, Illinois.

Geography and climate

Moro has a Mediterranean climate (Köppen Csb) with hot, dry summers with cool mornings, and chilly, wetter winters. Between June 15 and September 18 of 1932 there were ninety-six days without even a trace of rainfall. Temperatures will reach  on an average of twenty afternoons, though  can be expected only twice each year. The hottest temperature on record has been  on July 27 of 1939. Winters are cold if not usually severe: maxima top freezing on all but twenty afternoons and only two mornings each winter will fall to or below , with the coldest temperature being  on January 26 and 27 of 1957, and the coldest maximum temperature  on December 31, 1968.

Precipitation is very low due to the rain shadow of the Cascades and the valley location, being around  lower than even the driest areas in the Olympic rain shadow like Sequim.

Demographics

2010 census
As of the census of 2010, there were 324 people, 149 households, and 86 families residing in the city. The racial makeup of the city was 92.6% White, 3.1% Native American, 2.8% from other races, and 1.5% from two or more races. Hispanic or Latino people of any race were 4.0% of the population.

There were 149 households, of which 21.5% had children under the age of 18 living with them, 47.7% were married couples living together, 8.1% had a female householder with no husband present, 2.0% had a male householder with no wife present, and 42.3% were non-families. 36.2% of all households were made up of individuals, and 18.2% had someone living alone who was 65 years of age or older. The average household size was 2.17 and the average family size was 2.85.

The median age in the city was 48.1 years. 19.4% of residents were under the age of 18; 7.1% were between the ages of 18 and 24; 17.7% were from 25 to 44; 30.3% were from 45 to 64; and 25.6% were 65 years of age or older. The gender makeup of the city was 47.2% male and 52.8% female.

2000 census
As of the census of 2000, there were 337 people, 133 households, and 94 families residing in the city. The population density was 696.4 people per square mile (271.1/km). There were 150 housing units at an average density of 310.0 per square mile (120.7/km). The racial makeup of the city was 92.58% White, 1.19% African American, 1.19% Native American, 0.30% Asian, 3.26% from other races, and 1.48% from two or more races. Hispanic or Latino people of any race were 5.34% of the population.

There were 133 households, out of which 35.3% had children under the age of 18 living with them, 52.6% were married couples living together, 15.0% had a female householder with no husband present, and 29.3% were non-families. 27.1% of all households were made up of individuals, and 16.5% had someone living alone who was 65 years of age or older. The average household size was 2.53 and the average family size was 3.10.

In the city, the population was spread out, with 30.9% under the age of 18, 6.5% from 18 to 24, 22.3% from 25 to 44, 23.1% from 45 to 64, and 17.2% who were 65 years of age or older. The median age was 40 years. For every 100 females, there were 97.1 males. For every 100 females age 18 and over, there were 94.2 males.

The median income for a household in the city was $35,625, and the median income for a family was $40,625. Males had a median income of $35,313 versus $15,417 for females. The per capita income for the city was $14,887. About 14.7% of families and 16.8% of the population were below the poverty line, including 19.0% of those under age 18 and 9.8% of those age 65 or over.

References

External links

 Listing for Moro in the Oregon Blue Book
 Profile of Moro from Sherman County

Cities in Oregon
County seats in Oregon
Cities in Sherman County, Oregon
1899 establishments in Oregon
Populated places established in 1899